"The Yellow and The Green'" is the Alma Mater of North Dakota State University in Fargo, North Dakota. "The Yellow and The Green" was written by a young North Dakota Agricultural College (now known as North Dakota State University) faculty member, Archibald E. Minard, in 1907. Minard later took the lyrics to Dr. Clarence S. Putnam, a fellow NDAC professor, to develop a musical setting for the lyrics. Minard hoped that the song would become the official song of the state of North Dakota. Instead, that designation went to another song for which Putnam composed the music, the "North Dakota Hymn".

On February 24, 2016, Dean Bresciani, the president of NDSU, asked the academic community to remove all but the first stanza and to create a committee to study the song and find an appropriate compromise. This was due to a complaint about cultural and ethnic references in the third stanza.

Lyrics
Lyrics composed in 1908

Notes

External links
November 12th, 1907 Spectrum with "The Yellow and the Green" lyrics
A brief history of "The Yellow and the Green" — Tom Isern (Professor of History, NDSU)
"The Yellow and The Green" score
"The Yellow and The Green" audio recording

North Dakota State University
American college songs
Alma mater songs
1907 songs